Oleksandr Nazarenko (born 24 June 1986) is a Ukrainian Paralympic judoka. At the 2020 Summer Paralympics, he won a bronze medal in the men's 90 kg event.

References

External links
 
 
 

1986 births
Living people

Paralympic judoka of Ukraine
Paralympic bronze medalists for Ukraine
Paralympic medalists in judo
Judoka at the 2020 Summer Paralympics
Medalists at the 2020 Summer Paralympics
Sportspeople from Dnipro
20th-century Ukrainian people
21st-century Ukrainian people